Diego Licinio Lázaro Fuoli (born 20 October 1997) is a Spanish footballer who plays as a goalkeeper for UD Almería.

Club career
Born in Zaragoza, Aragon, Fuoli joined Villarreal CF's youth setup in 2015, from AD Stadium Casablanca. Promoted to the C-team for the 2016–17 season, he made his senior debut on 20 August 2016 by starting in a 2–2 Tercera División away draw against UD Alzira.

After being a regular starter for the C-side, Fuoli was promoted to the reserves in July 2017. A backup to Ander Cantero in his first season and to Joan Femenías in his second, he became a regular starter in his third, but left the club on 30 June 2020.

On 13 August 2020, Fuoli agreed to a contract with CE Sabadell, newly promoted to Segunda División. He made his professional debut on 5 November, starting in a 12– home loss against UD Almería.

On 6 August 2021, after featuring rarely, Fuoli moved to another reserve team, UD Almería B in Tercera División RFEF. Initially a third-choice in the first team behind Fernando Martínez and Giorgi Makaridze, he was definitely promoted to the squad ahead of the 2022–23 campaign; despite the departure of the Georgian, he remained a third-choice after the arrival of Fernando Pacheco.

Fuoli made his first team debut for the Rojiblancos on 13 November 2022, starting in a 2–0 away loss against CD Arenteiro, for the season's Copa del Rey.

References

External links

1997 births
Living people
Footballers from Zaragoza
Spanish footballers
Association football goalkeepers
Segunda División players
Segunda División B players
Tercera División players
Tercera Federación players
Villarreal CF C players
Villarreal CF B players
CE Sabadell FC footballers
UD Almería B players
UD Almería players